Beacharra ware, also known as Ballyalton bowls, is a style of Middle Neolithic pottery, defined by Thomas Hastie Bryce (1862–1946), which is only found in the western parts of Scotland, including Kintyre). The comparable pottery style in Ireland is known as Western Neolithic ware. British archaeologist, Stuart Piggott divided Beacharra ware into 3 groups:

 A) unornamented bag-shaped bowls 
 B) decorated carinated bowls with a rim diameter smaller than the diameter at the carination with incised or channelled ornaments (arcs, straight lines and U-shaped)
 C) small bowls with panel ornaments in fine whipped cord.

References

Literature 
 Darvill, Timothy (2008). Oxford Concise Dictionary of Archaeology, 2nd ed., Oxford University Press, Oxford and New York, 
 Flanagan, Laurence. Ancient Ireland. Life before the Celts, Dublin, 1998. 
 Kipfer, Barbara Ann. Dictionary of Artifacts, Oxford: Blackwell, 2007. 

Archaeological artefact groups
Neolithic Scotland
Scottish pottery
History of Argyll and Bute